Grigorovo may refer to one of the following places in Russia:

Grigorovo, Novgorod Oblast
Grigorovo, Alexandrovsky District, Vladimir Oblast
Grigorovo, Melenkovsky District, Vladimir Oblast
Grigorovo, Yuryev-Polsky District, Vladimir Oblast
Grigorovo, Krasnoplamenskoye Rural Settlement, Alexandrovsky District, Vladimir Oblast
Grigorovo, Slednevskoye Rural Settlement, Alexandrovsky District, Vladimir Oblast
Grigorovo, Kaduysky District, Vologda Oblast